Eduardo Egüez (born in Buenos Aires, Argentina in 1959) is a lutenist, theorbist, and guitarist acclaimed for his interpretations of music by J.S.Bach.

Egüez began by first studying guitar with Miguel Angel Girollet and Eduardo Fernández. He then studied composition at the Catholic Argentine University. In 1995 he obtained his diploma in lute performance from the Schola Cantorum Basiliensis under the tutelage of Hopkinson Smith. Eduardo Egüez teaches lute and basso continuo at the Zürich Conservatory (Switzerland).

Performances
Eduardo Egüez has given many solo recitals in South America, Europe, Australia, and Japan. He received awards from Promociones Musicales in Buenos Aires, 1984; Círculo Guitarrístico Argentino in Buenos Aires, 1984; Concours International de Guitare in Paris (Radio France), 1986; V Concurso Internacional de Guitarra (Jacinto and Inocencio Guerrero Foundation) in Madrid, 1989.

He has also performed as a basso continuo player, as a member of such ensembles as Elyma, Hesperion XXI, Ensemble Baroque de Limoges, La Grande Écurie et la Chambre du Roy, Aurora, Concerto Italiano, Labyrinto, The Rare Fruits Council, Café Zimmermann, Les Sacqueboutiers, Ricercar Consort, „Stylus Phantasticus“ and his own ensemble La Chimera. Furthermore, he has also accompanied artists such as Furio Zanasi, Emma Kirkby, María Cristina Kiehr, Rolf Lislevand, Victor Torres inter alia.

Recordings
Eduardo Egüez has recorded for many labels: Astrée Auvidis, Astrée Naïve, Arcana, Glossa Music, K617, Opus 111, Alia Vox, E Lucevan le Stelle, Stradivarius, Symphonia, Alpha Records, Ambroisie, Naxos Records, Flora, Mirare, Accent Records, Harmonia Mundi France. As a soloist he has recorded “Tombeau” with works by Silvius Leopold Weiss (E Lucevan le Stelle), the complete lute works by J. S. Bach (M.A. recordings) and “Le Maître du Roi” with works by Robert de Visée (also M.A. recordings). 

With his own Ensemble La Chimera, he has recorded for the label M.A. recordings “Buenos Aires Madrigal” (fusion of early Italian madrigals and Argentine tango) and “Tonos y Tonadas” (fusion of early Spanish “tonos humanos” and folk music from Latin America).

Selected discography
 Amarante Céline Scheen, soprano; Philippe Pierlot, viola da gamba; Eduardo Egüez, lute. Flora 2010
 Odisea Negra - music of slaves in the 17th century.  Ablaye Cissoko (griot, Senegal), Ivan García (tenor, Venezuela). Compositions by Martínez Compañón, Gaspar Fernandes (1565-1629), Miguel Matamoros, Carmito Gamboa, Gilberto Valdés. Readings of poems by Nicolás Guillén (Cuba) and Manuel del Cabral (Dominican Republic). Naïve Records November 2011

References

Lutenists
Argentine performers of early music
Living people
1959 births
Theorbists
Musicians from Buenos Aires